Daraselia (Georgian: დარასელია) is a Georgian surname that may refer to:

Vitaly Daraselia, (1957–1982), Georgian football midfielder
Vitali Daraselia Jr. (born 1978), Georgian football midfielder, son of Vitaly
Giorgi Daraselia (born 1968), Georgian-Israeli football player

Georgian-language surnames